Tephritis truncata is a species of tephritid or fruit flies in the genus Tephritis of the family Tephritidae.

Distribution
Central & Southern. Europe to South Russia & Caucasus Tunisia.

References

Tephritinae
Insects described in 1844
Diptera of Africa
Diptera of Europe